"Un Hombre Normal" is a song recorded by Mexican singer Espinoza Paz, released as a single from his album of the same title. The song became his fourth top 5 hit on the Billboard Latin Songs chart, and the third to peak at No.4, after "Al Diablo Lo Nuestro" (2010) and "El Culpable" (2011). "Un Hombre Normal" was nominated for a Pop Song of the Year at the Premio Lo Nuestro 2013.

Trackslisting 
Album version
"Un Hombre Normal" — 4:15

Charts

Weekly charts

Year-end charts

See also
List of number-one songs of 2012 (Mexico)

References

2012 songs
Espinoza Paz songs